Muncie Union Station was a passenger railroad station in Muncie, Indiana at 630 South High Street. As a union station, in earlier decades it served the Cleveland, Cincinnati, Chicago and St. Louis Railway (the 'Big Four') and the New York, Chicago and St. Louis Railroad (the 'Nickel Plate Road'). Made of limestone, it was built in 1883 in the Romanesque Revival style, for the CCC & St. L. Other stations in Muncie served the Chesapeake and Ohio Railroad, the Muncie Street Railway and the Pennsylvania Railroad.

In later years the New York Central, the parent company for the CCC & St. L., continued passenger trains in its own name. In 1959, the last Nickel Plate passenger trains left the station. The final passenger trains, discontinued in the liquidation of routes for the switchover to Amtrak in 1971, were unnamed Indianapolis - Cleveland Penn Central east- and westbound remnants of the Southwestern Limited. The station was demolished by 1990.

Noteworthy passenger services
The station hosted several named long-distance passenger trains. 
New York Central:
Detroit Night Express—St. Louis eastbound to Detroit
Indianapolis Express—Detroit westbound to St. Louis
Knickerbocker—St. Louis - New York City via Cleveland, east- and westbound
Southwestern Limited—St. Louis - New York City via Cleveland, east- and westbound
Nickel Plate:
Blue Dart—St. Louis eastbound to Cleveland
Blue Arrow—Cleveland westbound to St. Louis

See also
Cincinnati, Richmond, & Muncie Depot (Muncie, Indiana)

References

External links

Former New York, Chicago and St. Louis Railroad stations
Former New York Central Railroad stations
Former railway stations in Indiana
Rail transportation in Indiana
Transportation in Indiana
Union stations in the United States